Below are listed all the matches played by the Costa Rica national football team between 2010 and 2019.

Overview

By team

By confederation

2010

Statistics

2011
The year was marked by the inauguration of the new national stadium in San José in late March. Since then, the stadium has served as the home stadium of the team. To encourage the fans to go to the stadium, the Costa Rican Football Federation made a heavy investment by organizing friendlies against FIFA World Cup winners Argentina, Brazil and the then most recent champions Spain.

Tragedy also hit the national team during 2011, when defender Dennis Marshall (along with his wife) died in a car accident. Marshall died just five days after scoring his only international goal in a CONCACAF Gold Cup match against Honduras.

Overall, 2011 showed lackluster results for the national team. Failures to overcome Honduras at the Copa Centroamericana final and the Gold Cup quarter-finals, along with a poor performance at the Copa América prompted the dismissal of Ricardo La Volpe. After the departure of La Volpe, Rónald González served as interim manager for the team until the arrival of Jorge Luis Pinto in September.

Statistics
Coach(es)

General statistics

Goalscorers

7 goals
Marco Ureña

3 goals

Randall Brenes
Joel Campbell

2 goals
Álvaro Saborío
Rodney Wallace

1 goal
Celso Borges
José Miguel Cubero
Kenny Cunningham
Dennis Marshall
Josué Martínez
Heiner Mora
Víctor Núñez
Bryan Oviedo

2012

Statistics
Coach(es)

General statistics

Goalscorers

6 goals
Álvaro Saborío

4 goals
Joel Campbell

2 goals
Randall Brenes

1 goal
Christian Bolaños
Celso Borges
José Miguel Cubero
Cristian Gamboa
Giancarlo González
Álvaro Sánchez
Olman Vargas

1 own goal
 Jonathan López

2013
The year marked a significant recovery in the team status within the Confederation, after several years of decay. In January, the team won the Copa Centroamericana after two consecutive failures in 2009 and 2011. In September, Costa Rica qualified to the 2014 FIFA World Cup after their absence in the 2010 edition. 2013 also marked the year with the most victories for the Costa Rica national team, with 13 victories.

On March 22, Costa Rica played against the United States at the Dick's Sporting Goods Park in Commerce City. The match, dubbed as the Snow Clásico in the United States, was played under a heavy snow fall. As the United States won the match with a goal by Clint Dempsey, Costa Ricans were enraged by the circumstances around the match. On September 6, the Ticos would defeat the United States in San José by 3–1, which was considered as a revenge.

On October 15, Costa Rica defeated Mexico in San José by 2–1, which marked the first victory over the Mexican team in over twelve years, the latest being the Aztecazo in June 2001. It was also the first victory Costa Rica had against Mexico in home soil for over twenty years.

Statistics
Coach(es)

General statistics

Goalscorers

5 goals
Celso Borges

4 goals
Jairo Arrieta

3 goals
Bryan Ruiz

2 goals
Michael Barrantes
Álvaro Saborío

1 goal
Jhonny Acosta
Randall Brenes
Diego Calvo
Joel Campbell
Mauricio Castillo
Giancarlo González
Pablo Herrera
Cristhiam Lagos
Roy Miller
Michael Umaña
Rodney Wallace

1 own goal
 Dalton Eiley

2014
Below are listed all the matches played by the Costa Rica national football team in 2014.

The year, regarded to be the best in the history of Costa Rican football, saw the Ticos becoming the revelation team at the 2014 FIFA World Cup.

After being drawn into Group D —along with former World Champions Uruguay, Italy and England—, initial reaction towards the team was of mockery, and underestimation. During a segment of TeleSUR program De Zurda, Diego Maradona mocked the team by saying "if I was Costa Rican, I would have to shoot myself [in the balls]". Costa Rica topped the group undefeated after beating both Uruguay and Italy, finishing with a draw against England. The Ticos would defeat Greece in the Round of 16 throughout the penalty shootouts. Costa Rica was then eliminated by the Netherlands in the quarter-finals again in the penalty shootouts.

After the World Cup, Jorge Luis Pinto resigned as the coach of the national team, denouncing that a member of his coaching staff requested his sacking. Paulo Wanchope assumed as the interim coach of the team, only to be confirmed in the charge in January 2015. With Wanchope in charge, Costa Rica won the 2014 Copa Centroamericana, thus qualifying to the Copa América Centenario.

Statistics

Coach(es)

General statistics

Goalscorers

5 goals
Celso Borges

4 goals
Bryan Ruiz

3 goals
Juan Bustos Golobio
Álvaro Saborío
Johan Venegas

2 goals
Joel Campbell
Óscar Duarte
Marco Ureña

1 goal
David Ramírez
John Jairo Ruiz

2015
Below are listed all the matches played by the Costa Rica national football team in 2015.

During most of the year, the team suffered with lackluster results, including their second worst streak without winning. The CONCACAF Gold Cup saw the Ticos reaching the quarterfinals with three draws in the group stage –against Jamaica, El Salvador and Canada– only to be eliminated by Mexico with a controversial penalty awarded to the Mexicans.

On August 11, the team's manager Paulo Wanchope was involved in a fight during a match of the under-23 national team. After the match the team played against Panama at the Estadio Maracaná, Wanchope tried to enter the pitch from the stands, being prevented to do so by a security official. During the struggle with the guard to open the gate, Wanchope accidentally hit a boy and proceeded to fight with the guard. After the incident, Wanchope met with members of the Costa Rican Football Federation and announced his resignation from the management of the national team.

Óscar Ramírez was appointed as the new manager of the team, just a week after being announced as Wanchope's assistant. With Ramírez in charge, the Ticos earned their first triump of the year by beating Uruguay 1–0 in San José, and beginning the qualification process to the 2018 FIFA World Cup with two wins against Haiti and Panama.

Statistics
Coach(es)

General statistics

Goalscorers

3 goals
Bryan Ruiz

2 goals
David Ramírez

1 goal
Joel Campbell
Cristian Gamboa
Roy Miller
Álvaro Saborío
Marco Ureña
Johan Venegas
Kendall Waston

1 owl goal
 Miguel Layún

2016
.
The year, which began with a loss in a friendly against Venezuela, resumed the Costa Rican campaign during the fourth round of the CONCACAF qualifying process for the 2018 FIFA World Cup. A double match-up in March against Jamaica saw the Ticos earning four points –after a draw in Kingston and a victory in San José– which led them at the brink of qualification to the next round.

The qualification process was interrupted by the Copa América Centenario, for which Costa Rica prepared by once again facing Venezuela in San José, this time won by the Ticos. Costa Rica began the tournament with a scoreless draw against Paraguay, However, the Costa Rican aspirations came to an abrupt end after a 4–0 loss against the United States, to which La Nación criticized the lack of a second defensive midfielder as an important factor for the defeat, as manager Óscar Ramírez decided to use Celso Borges alone in that position. Already eliminated after the Americans defeated Paraguay, the Costa Ricans redeemed themselves by defeating Colombia by 3–2.

La Sele sealed their qualification to the 2018 FIFA World Cup qualification final round, also known as Hexagonal, by defeating Haiti and Panama and finishing on the first place of their group. In October, Costa Rica defeated 2018 FIFA World Cup hosts Russia by 3–4 at the Krasnodar Stadium.

Costa Rica began the Hexagonal with a 0–2 win against Trinidad and Tobago in Port of Spain. The Ticos went on to avenge their Copa América Centenario 4–0 defeat against the United States by defeating the Americans in San José by the same score. The victory marked the departure of United States' coach Jürgen Klinsmann and also secured the first place for Costa Rica.

Statistics

Coach(es)

General statistics

Goalscorers

4 goals
Christian Bolaños

3 goals
Joel Campbell
Johan Venegas

2 goals
Randall Azofeifa
Celso Borges
Rónald Matarrita
Bryan Ruiz

1 goal
Jhonny Acosta
Cristian Gamboa
Ariel Rodríguez

1 own goal
 Frank Fabra
 Vasili Berezutski

2017

Below are listed all the matches played by the Costa Rica national football team in 2017.

The year began with La Sele making their worst display in the Copa Centroamericana since 1995, finishing fourth with a lone win against Belize, draws against El Salvador, Nicaragua and Honduras, and a loss against Panama.

2018 FIFA World Cup qualification resumed with difficulties for the team, losing the first place of the Hexagonal to Mexico after a 2–0 defeat at the Estadio Azteca, a loss for which goalkeeper Keylor Navas was subject of criticism because of the second goal. Four days later, La Sele rescued a point in San Pedro Sula against Honduras with a header by Kendall Waston. The struggle continued in June, with a scoreless draw at the Estadio Nacional against Panama, which ended the Costa Rican streak of ten consecutive wins at home during World Cup qualifiers. Costa Rica returned to victory road by defeating Trinidad and Tobago in San José.

The qualification process was interrupted in July by the CONCACAF Gold Cup. Costa Rica began the tournament by defeating Honduras with a lone goal by Marco Ureña, marking the first time the Ticos defeated Honduras in a Gold Cup match. La Sele went on to top their group after a draw against Canada and a victory against French Guiana. In the quarter-finals, Costa Rica defeated Panama with an own goal by Aníbal Godoy, thus making the Ticos qualify to the Gold Cup semifinals for the first time since 2009. The United States defeated Costa Rica in the semifinals with goals by Jozy Altidore and Clint Dempsey.

In September, Costa Rica defeated the United States in New Jersey as Marco Ureña, who was subject of criticism because of his lack of effectiveness, scored a brace to secure the first Costa Rican win over the Americans in U.S. since 1985, also ending Bruce Arena's undefeated streak since he took over the management of the United States national team. Ureña scored again four days later against Mexico in San José, in a match that ended in a draw, as a side post deflected a shot by Johan Venegas, denying the Ticos the chance to qualify to the World Cup that day.

Devastation left by Hurricane Nate forced the Costa Rican Football Federation to postpone the match against Honduras in San José, originally programmed for October 6, to the next day. Costa Rica secured their presence at the 2018 FIFA World Cup with a draw against the Hondurans with a stoppage time header by Kendall Waston. Costa Rica ended the qualification process as the second place of the Hexagonal after a loss against Panama in the last matchday, which allowed the Panamanians to qualify to their first ever World Cup. The match was met with controversy as referee Wálter López granted Panama's Blas Pérez a goal, in spite of the ball never crossing the line.

Costa Rica ended the year with two losses at European soil, an abrupt 5–0 thrashing to Spain in Málaga and a 1–0 defeat to Hungary in Budapest. Two weeks later, at the 2018 FIFA World Cup seeding, the Ticos were allocated into Group E, along with Brazil, Switzerland and Serbia.

Statistics
Coach(es)

General statistics

Goalscorers

4 goals
Marco Ureña
3 goals
Francisco Calvo
2 goals
José Guillermo Ortiz
Kendall Waston
Johan Venegas
1 goal
David Ramírez
Ariel Rodríguez
Bryan Ruiz
Rodney Wallace
1 own goal
 Aníbal Godoy

2018

2019

See also
Costa Rica at the Copa América

References

Costa Rica national football team results